Kamennomostsky (lit. stone bridge;  , Ḥadžəqo), also informally called Khadzhokh, is a rural locality (a settlement) in Maykopsky District of the Republic of Adygea, Russia, located on the Belaya River  south of Maykop. Population: 

An Adyghe aul, famous for its prolonged resistance against Russian rule in the Caucasian War of 1817–1864, was located on the territory of this settlement. In 1862, a Cossack outpost was built in place of the ravaged aul, which later grew into the stanitsa of Kamennomostskaya. The stanitsa was granted urban-type settlement status in 1948 but was demoted to rural locality on March 10, 2011.

The modern name of the settlement is after a collapsed rock that forms a natural bridge across the canyon.

References

External links
Tourism in Kamennomostsky 

Rural localities in Maykopsky District